Rust Bluff is a small bluff or promontory on the east side of Miller Range, overlooking Marsh Glacier 5 nautical miles (9 km) south of Corner Nunatak. Named by Advisory Committee on Antarctic Names (US-ACAN) for Izak C. Rust, professor of geology, University of Port Elizabeth, South Africa. Rust was international exchange scientist with the Ohio State University Geological Expedition, 1969–70, and with John Gunner collected geological samples at this bluff.
 

Cliffs of Oates Land